The 2014 World Judo Juniors Championships was held between 22 and 26 October 2014 in Fort Lauderdale, United States. The final day of competition featured men's and women's team events, both won by team Japan.

Medal summary

Men's events

Source Results

Women's events

Source Results

Medal table

References

External links
 

 U21
World Championships, Junior
World Junior
World Judo Junior Championships